Manuel Osborne-Paradis (born 8 February 1984) is a Canadian former World Cup alpine ski racer.

Born in North Vancouver, British Columbia, Osborne-Paradis grew up racing for the Whistler Mountain Ski Club. His first World Cup podium came in November 2006 at the Bombardier Winterstart men's downhill in Lake Louise, Alberta, Canada. His first victory was at the downhill of Kvitfjell in March 2009.

In April 2008, he joined forces with teammate Mike Janyk to provide a four-day training camp free of charge to underprivileged Canadian racers from around British Columbia. The camp, known locally as the "Cowboys Camp", took place on Whistler Mountain. but known in the community as Mike & Manny Camp.

On 29 January 2011, Osborne-Paradis crashed badly at the downhill race in Chamonix, France, and was airlifted by helicopter and treated for a broken fibula. He missed the 2011 World Championships and the remainder of the 2011 season, as well as the 2012 season.

Osborne-Paradis was a surprise bronze medalist in super-G at the 2017 World Championships, behind teammate Erik Guay and Norway's Kjetil Jansrud. Racing in bib number 26, outside the top group of racers, he won the medal on his 33rd birthday.

In a training run at Lake Louise in November 2018, Osborne-Paradis crashed and suffered a broken leg, ending his season.

World Cup results

Season standings

Race podiums
 3 wins – (2 DH, 1 SG)
 11 podiums – (10 DH, 1 SG)

World Championship results

Olympic results

References

External links

Alpine Canada.org – national ski team – athletes – Manuel Osborne-Paradis

1984 births
Living people
Sportspeople from North Vancouver
Canadian people of Spanish descent
Canadian male alpine skiers
Olympic alpine skiers of Canada
Alpine skiers at the 2006 Winter Olympics
Alpine skiers at the 2010 Winter Olympics
Alpine skiers at the 2014 Winter Olympics
Alpine skiers at the 2018 Winter Olympics